The 2021 Challenger de Santiago II was a professional tennis tournament played on clay courts. It was the 14th edition of the tournament which was part of the 2021 ATP Challenger Tour. It took place in Santiago, Chile between 4 and 10 October 2021.

Singles main-draw entrants

Seeds

 1 Rankings are as of 27 September 2021.

Other entrants
The following players received wildcards into the singles main draw:
  Diego Fernández Flores
  Gonzalo Lama
  Víctor Núñez

The following players received entry into the singles main draw using protected rankings:
  Gerald Melzer
  Gonçalo Oliveira

The following players received entry into the singles main draw as alternates:
  Hernán Casanova
  Lucas Catarina
  Nick Chappell

The following players received entry from the qualifying draw:
  Nicolás Álvarez
  Oliver Crawford
  Facundo Díaz Acosta
  Alexis Gautier

The following player received entry as a lucky loser:
  Cristian Rodríguez

Champions

Singles

  Juan Pablo Varillas def.  Sebastián Báez 6–4, 7–5.

Doubles

  Diego Hidalgo /  Nicolás Jarry def.  Evan King /  Max Schnur 6–3, 5–7, [10–6].

References

2021 ATP Challenger Tour
2021
2021 in Chilean tennis
October 2021 sports events in Chile